Škrlatica, historically also known as Suhi plaz ("Dry Avalanche"), is a mountain in the Slovenian Julian Alps. With its summit at 2,740m above sea level, it is the second highest peak in Slovenia (after Triglav at 2,864m) and the third highest in the Julian Alps as a whole (after Triglav and Jôf di Montasio / Montaž at 2,754m).

The mountain's name is the feminine adjectival form of the Slovene word , a cognate of "scarlet," referring to the dramatic reddish-purple shade of the steep northwestern rockface in the reddish light of sunset. The alternate name Suhi plaz refers to a scree below Mount Spodnji Rokav.

The first recorded ascent of Škrlatica was made from the southern side on 24 August 1880 by Julius Kugy, accompanied by the mountain guide Andrej Komac and the hunter Matija Kravanja.

References

External links 
 
 Škrlatica on hribi.net

Mountains of the Julian Alps
Two-thousanders of Slovenia